Nils Hilmer Lofgren (born June 21, 1951) is an American rock musician, recording artist, songwriter, and multi-instrumentalist. Along with his work as a solo artist, he has been a member of Bruce Springsteen's E Street Band since 1984, a member of Crazy Horse, and founder/frontman of the band Grin. Lofgren was inducted into the Rock and Roll Hall of Fame as a member of the E Street Band in 2014.

Biography

Early life and career
Lofgren was born in Chicago, Illinois, United States, to an Italian mother and a Swedish father. When he was a young child, the family moved to the Washington, D.C., suburb of Bethesda, Maryland. Lofgren's first instrument was classical accordion, beginning at age five, which he studied seriously for ten years. After studying classical music and jazz, throughout his youth, Lofgren switched his emphasis to rock music, and focused on the piano and the guitar.

Lofgren attended his local public high school Walter Johnson High School in Bethesda, MD. He had been a competitive gymnast in high school, a skill that was used on stage later in his performing career and reflected in the name of his 1985 album, Flip.

Grin
In 1968, Lofgren formed the band Grin with bassist George Daly (later replaced by Bob Gordon), and drummer Bob Berberich, former players in the DC band The Hangmen. The group played in venues throughout the Washington, D.C., area.

Lofgren met Neil Young while Young was performing at the Georgetown club The Cellar Door, and began a long association. Young invited Lofgren to come to California and the Grin trio (Lofgren, Daly and Berberich) drove out west and lived for some months at a home Neil Young rented in Laurel Canyon. Lofgren would eventually use his album credits from working with Young to land Grin a record deal in 1971. 

Daly left the band early on to become a Columbia Records A&R Executive and was replaced by bassist Bob Gordon, who remained through the release of four critically acclaimed albums of catchy hard rock from 1971 to 1974, with guitar as Lofgren's primary instrument. The single  "White Lies" got heavy airplay on Washington, D.C.-area radio. Lofgren wrote the majority of the group's songs, and often shared vocal duties with other members of the band (primarily drummer Bob Berberich). After the second album he added brother Tom Lofgren as a rhythm guitarist. Grin failed to hit the big time, and were released by their record company.

Neil Young and Crazy Horse
Lofgren joined Neil Young at age 19 to play piano and guitar on the album After the Gold Rush. Lofgren maintained his musical relationship with Young, appearing as a part of the Santa Monica Flyers on Young's Tonight's the Night album and tour, and again on the Trans album and tour. He has also been a recurring member of Crazy Horse (1970–1971; 2018–present), appearing on their 1971 LP and contributing songs to their catalogue. In 2018, Lofgren re-joined Crazy Horse and along with the band performed on Young's 2019 album Colorado and 2021's Barn.

Solo career
After Grin disbanded in 1974, Lofgren released his self-titled debut solo album  which was a success with critics; a 1975 Rolling Stone review by Jon Landau labeled it one of the finest rock albums of the year, and NME ranked it fifth on its list of albums of the year. Subsequent albums did not always garner critical favor, although Cry Tough was voted number 10 in the 1976 NME Album round up; I Came to Dance in particular received a scathing review in the New Rolling Stone Record Guide. He achieved progressive rock radio hits in the mid-1970s with "Back It Up", "Keith Don't Go" and "I Came to Dance". His song "Bullets Fever", about the 1978 NBA champion Washington Bullets, would become a favorite in the Washington area. Throughout the 1970s, Lofgren released solo albums and toured extensively with a backing band that usually included brother Tom on rhythm guitar. Lofgren's concerts displayed his reputation for theatrics, such as playing guitar while doing flips on a trampoline.

In 1971, he appeared on stage on the Roy Buchanan Special, PBS TV, with Bill Graham. In 1973, he appeared with Grin on NBC on Midnight Special, performing three songs live. In 1978, he wrote and sang the "Nobody Bothers Me" theme for a D.C. Jhoon Rhee Tae Kwon Do advertisement, and also appeared in the ill-received Sgt. Pepper's Lonely Hearts Club Band movie. Lofgren appeared on Late Night with David Letterman, to promote his 1985 solo release Flip. Lofgren is credited on two of Lou Gramm's (of Foreigner) solo albums: Ready or Not released in 1987 (Lofgren listed as lead guitarist) and Long Hard Look released in 1989 (Lofgren listed as one of the guitarists). In 1987, he contributed the television show theme arrangement for Hunter. In 1993 he contributed to The Simpsons, with two Christmas jingles with Bart. In 1995, he appeared on a PBS tribute to the Beatles along with Dr. John. From 1991 to 1995, he was the CableAce Awards musical director and composer.

 

Lofgren continues to record and to tour as a solo act, with Patti Scialfa, with Neil Young, and as a two-time member of Ringo Starr's All-Starr Band. Many of the people he worked with on those tours appeared on his 1991 album, Silver Lining. During the 2000s he got his own "Nils Lofgren Day" in Montgomery County, Maryland (August 25). In 2006 Lofgren released Sacred Weapon, featuring guest appearances by David Crosby, Graham Nash, Willie Nelson and Martin Sexton. In 2006 he recorded a live DVD Nils Lofgren & Friends: Acoustic Live at the Legendary Birchmere Music Hall in Alexandria, Virginia.

On June 23, 2006, Lofgren performed at a benefit concert for Arthur Lee at New York's Beacon Theatre, along with Robert Plant, Ian Hunter, Yo La Tengo and Garland Jeffreys. In 2007, he appeared playing guitar as part of Jerry Lee Lewis' backing band for Lewis' Last Man Standing Live concert DVD. He released The Loner – Nils Sings Neil, an album of acoustic covers of Neil Young songs, in 2008.

In September 2008, Lofgren had hip replacement surgery for both of his hips as a result of years of playing basketball, "performance 'flips' on stage, and age."

In August 2014, a box set, Face the Music, was released on the Fantasy label. The career-spanning retrospective contains nine CD's and a DVD covering 45 years.

The creation of Lofgren's 2015 live album UK 2015 Face the Music Tour was inspired by his wife Amy commenting that his recent live shows were the best she'd seen him do, as well as fans wanting to have a recording of the show they’d just seen.

In December 2018, PBS NewsHour aired a 10-minute career retrospective Nils Lofgren: 50 years of ‘just being a guy in the band’.

Lofgren was a guest on a "Private Lives" one-hour radio special on East London Radio in the UK in October 2020. This series is shared across radio stations online and on FM/DAB, covering much of the UK.

Bruce Springsteen and the E Street Band

In 1984, he joined Bruce Springsteen's backing band, the E Street Band, as the replacement for Steven Van Zandt on guitar and vocals, in time for Springsteen's Born in the U.S.A. Tour. Lofgren would appear on his first Springsteen album with 1987's Tunnel of Love and its Tunnel of Love Express and Human Rights Now! supporting tours. In 1989 Springsteen broke up the E Street Band and Lofgren returned to his solo work. 

In 1995, the E Street Band, featuring both Lofgren and Van Zandt, recorded new songs for Springsteen's Greatest Hits album, though nothing else came from this reunion. In 1999, Springsteen, minus the E Street Band, was inducted into the Rock and Roll Hall of Fame. The E Street Band would finally be inducted fifteen years later in 2014. Despite not being inducted in 1999 with Springsteen, the E Street Band (again with Lofgren and Van Zandt) performed with Springsteen for the first time since 1988 at the induction ceremony. This led to a successful Reunion Tour from 1999 to 2000 and a lineup featuring both Lofgren and Van Zandt as full-time members. The reunion tour resulted in 2002's album,The Rising, the first album featuring the E Street Band since 1988, and another tour in 2002 and 2003. Springsteen then worked on other projects and toured without the E Street Band's involvement until 2007's Magic album and tour of 2007/2008. This tour was followed by 2009's Working on a Dream album and  tour. In 2012, Springsteen released Wrecking Ball, which featured some of the E Street Band members;  Lofgren did not appear, though he did perform with the band on the album's supporting tour. 2014 saw the release of the album High Hopes along with another tour. In 2016, Springsteen celebrated the 35th anniversary of his album The River, with a tour in support of The Ties That Bind: The River Collection box set. In 2020, Springsteen released his album Letter to You, which featured the E Street Band; a supporting tour was delayed until 2023 due to the COVID-19 pandemic. Lofgren tested positive for COVID-19, forcing him to miss one show on the tour in February 2023. It was the first show Lofgren had missed since joining the band in 1984.

Other work
The late novelist Clive Cussler lived close to Lofgren's Arizona home, and collaborated on a song with him titled "What Ever Happened to Muscatel?"

On August 17, 2017, Lofgren was inducted into the Arizona Music & Entertainment Hall of Fame.

In May 2018, Lofgren replaced Frank Sampedro in Crazy Horse for their reunion concerts with Neil Young.

On January 29, 2022, Lofgren pulled his music from Spotify, after Neil Young and Joni Mitchell had done the same. This was in response to their belief that COVID-19 misinformation was spread by the streaming service's The Joe Rogan Experience.

Musical equipment

Guitars

Fender Stratocaster- 1961 (Reissues on tour)

For the 2019 album, Colorado, Lofgren brought two guitars:
Gibson Les Paul – 1952 goldtop, with Bigsby
Gretsch Black Falcon

Effects
Barber Burn Unit overdrive
Strymon Brigadier dBucket Delay
TC Electronic ND-1 Nova Delay

Amplifiers
Fuchs 4 Aces 112 combo 

The E Street Band

Lofgren primarily uses a variety of Fender guitars and amplifiers.

Guitars

Fender Stratocaster – Including two 1961 models which he often uses.
Fender Jazzmasters
Gibson Les Paul – 1952 Goldtop.
Gibson SG – Cherry red. Used on Johnny Bye Bye during the E Street Band's Magic Tour.
Gibson Flying V – Used during Grin's reunion tour in 2001.
B.C. Rich Mockingbird
Epiphone Les Paul – Used on tours with Ringo Starr.
Martin D-18 – Given to Lofgren by Neil Young.
Gretsch Black Penguin

Fender Telecaster
Fender Telecaster Black. Used on Born To Run during the "Magic" Tour.
Gibson L-10 acoustic
Spector ARC6
Takamine acoustic guitars
Owens/Zeta resonator guitars
Carter pedal steel guitars

During performances of the song "The River" on The E Street Band's Working on a Dream Tour, Nils would use a custom Fender Stratocaster double-neck guitar, with one 12-string neck, and one standard six. The 12 string was tuned B-G-Bb-F-D-Eb, and the six string A-G#-Bb-Bb-Bb-F#.

Effects

Vocoder
Electro-Harmonix POG
Barber Burn Unit overdrives
FullTone Fulldrive2
Line 6 DL4 delay
DigiTech Whammy
Digital Music GCX audio switcher
Furman power conditioner

Line 6 Pod Pro
BOSS OC-3
BOSS DD-3
Korg DTR tuner
Peterson AutoStrobe 490
Voodoo Lab Ground Control

Amplifiers

Fender Twin Reverbs – Used most recently.
Fender blackface Super Reverbs – With four 10" speakers.
Fender Hot Rod Deluxe

Fender Vibro Kings – With three 10" speakers'
Fender Vibro King Custom
Fender Hot Rod DeVilles
Fuchs ODS 50 -used at 2012 Grammys

Discography

Grin discography
 1971: Grin (Spindizzy/Epic)
 1972: 1+1 (Spindizzy/Epic)
 1973: All Out (Spindizzy/Epic)
 1973: Gone Crazy (A&M)

Solo discography

With Crazy Horse
Crazy Horse (1971)

With Neil Young
After the Gold Rush (1970)
Tonight's the Night (1975)
Trans (1982)
In Berlin (1983)
Unplugged (February 1993)
Roxy: Tonight's the Night Live (2018) Recorded in (1973)
Colorado (2019) (with Crazy Horse)
Barn (2021) (with Crazy Horse)

With Jerry Williams
 Jerry Williams (Spindizzy) (1972) – Lofgren/Grin played on three songs on the album; additionally, they played on the b-side of the single, "Crazy 'Bout You Baby"

With Lou Reed (as co-writer)
The Bells (1979)

With Bruce Springsteen and the E Street Band
Live/1975-85 (1986)
Tunnel of Love (1987)
Chimes of Freedom (1988)
Greatest Hits (1995)
Blood Brothers (1996)
Tracks (1998)
18 Tracks (1999)
Bruce Springsteen & The E Street Band: Live in New York City (2001)
The Rising (2002)
The Essential Bruce Springsteen (2003)
Magic (2007)
Magic Tour Highlights (2008)
Bruce Springsteen & The E Street Band Greatest Hits (2009)
Working on a Dream (2009)
Wrecking Ball (2012)
Collection: 1973–2012 (2013)
High Hopes (2014)
American Beauty (2014)
Bruce Springsteen Archives (2014-present)
Chapter and Verse (2016)
The Live Series: Songs of the Road (2018)
The Live Series: Songs of Friendship (2019)
The Live Series: Songs of Hope (2019)
Letter to You (2020)

With Lou Gramm
Ready or Not (1987)

References

External links

 
 History at nilslofgren.com
 shinesilently.com/nilsalbums Discography on UK fan site
 
 
 
 Favourite Guitarist – Nils Lofgren on LGA
 Alan McGee on Lofgren and Vetiver

1951 births
Living people
20th-century American guitarists
21st-century accordionists
American accordionists
American male guitarists
American male singers
American people of Italian descent
American people of Swedish descent
American rock guitarists
American rock keyboardists
American session musicians
A&M Records artists
Columbia Records artists
Crazy Horse (band) members
E Street Band members
Epic Records artists
Guitarists from Chicago
Guitarists from Maryland
Pedal steel guitarists
People from Garrett Park, Maryland
Musicians from Scottsdale, Arizona
Members
Rykodisc artists
Singers from Chicago
Singers from Maryland
Slide guitarists
Songwriters from Illinois
Steel guitarists